The Portrait of Count Stanislas Potocki is an equestrian portrait completed by the French painter Jacques-Louis David in 1781 and depicting the Polish politician and writer of the Enlightenment Period, Stanisław Kostka Potocki. 

Unusually for an equestrian portrait, Potocki is very informally dressed for the period, with no coat. Only the blue sash of the Polish Order of the White Eagle indicates his rank.

The background of a blank wall is also unusual, but not unprecedented. Most of David's smaller portraits had blank backgrounds in brown or another colour, and he was perhaps not at home doing a large landscape.

Overview 
David had met Potocki during his stay at the Villa Medici in Rome in 1780, after winning the first prize for painting in the Prix de Rome, and begun working on the painting around that time. The work was painted after Saint Roch interceding with the Virgin for the Plague-Stricken and before Belisarius begging for alms. Its equestrian format is owed to influences from Rubens. 

The painting was completed during the twenty-year period between the First (1772) and Second (1793) Partitions of Poland, a moment of great political decline for the Polish-Lithuanian Commonwealth. Potocki, who was a prominent patriot and would go on to serve as a general during the Polish–Russian War of 1792, is depicted wearing the Order of the White Eagle, which he had been awarded in 1781.

History of display 

Potocki, the subject of the painting, displayed the work at Wilanów Palace, his residence near Warsaw. The ownership was subsequently passed to the Branicki family in 1892. In 1932, the painting, along with several other works by David, was shown at the Exhibition of French Art 1200–1900, an extensive and highly publicized survey show of French art across seven centuries, organized at the Royal Academy of Arts in London.

During the Second World War it was looted by the German forces, then passed into Soviet Russian hands after the war, before being repatriated to Poland in 1956. The work is currently on permanent display at the Museum of King John III's Palace at Wilanów.

References

External links 

 Portret Stanisława Kostki Potockiego 

1780 paintings
Potocki
Art and cultural repatriation after World War II
Potocki
Count Stanislas Potocki
Dogs in art